Edinburgh International Climbing Arena (EICA:Ratho, formerly the Ratho Adventure Centre) is an adventure sports facility located in Ratho, near Edinburgh, Scotland. Built in a disused quarry, it is one of the largest indoor climbing walls in the world.

The centre is now used by both recreational climbers and for competitions, and is also home to the Scottish National Judo Academy.

History

Originally used for supplying stone to the Central Belt of Scotland due to its proximity to the Union Canal, the quarry expanded from around a third of its present size in 1853 to the current outline in 1895. Edinburgh climbers Rab Anderson, Duncan McCallum and architect David Taylor formed the Ratho Quarry Company, and purchased the quarry in 1995 as the site for the climbing centre. The quarry, which had been unused for around ninety years, was filled with compacted rubble and heavily overgrown with trees and shrubs, making assessment of the site difficult until significant work had been carried out, but the assumption that the floor of the quarry was flat proved to be correct.

The climbing centre is located in the smaller of two lobes of a figure of eight that make up the quarry. During construction in April 2002, the partially completed roof was ripped off in a storm.

In March 2004 the centre went into receivership due to a leaky roof, poor management, and a lack of money, leaving a number of contractors unpaid.

It reopened on 25 May 2007, under the management of Edinburgh Leisure, a non-profit organisation which provides sport and leisure facilities on behalf of the City of Edinburgh Council.  was spent overhauling the roof, the plumbing, improving the car park and converting an unopened scuba diving tank into a dedicated bouldering room. Under new management, more emphasis was placed on making the centre accessible to families and visitors as well as experienced climbers.

Climbing

There are over 15,000 bolt-on holds in the centre, with 300 routes ranging in difficulty from grades 2 to 8b. There are a variety of lead and top rope walls at the centre ranging from 6 to 28 metres. As well as a trio of boulders in the centre of the main hall, there is a dedicated bouldering room, with routes ranging in difficulty from V0 to V15.

The only official world record International Federation of Sport Climbing speed climbing walls has two identical speed routes allow speed climbing competitions to be conducted head to head, and there is an articulated competition wall known as "The Hanger" that can be raised or lowered to change the angle of overhang.

The larger "lobe" of the quarry is also used for outdoor climbing, although some of the rock is described as "loose and scary". Formed from dolerite, there are around 65 known routes.

There is a cafe overlooking the main arena as well as smaller cafe on the ground floor. The centre has a fully equipped gym. Other classes are held in the Fitness Studio.
The centre also has a softplay with a café called Scrambles for children aged around 0-7 and additionally, the largest café/play area in Edinburgh, Rocktots. The centre also houses Scottish National Judo Academy, and Canoe Scotland's Sprint Performance programme.

Events

Competitions

EICA hosted the UIAA-ICC Boulder & Lead World Cup in December 2003, the IFSC World Cup Lead and Speed in September 2017, the IFSC European Championship (Lead and Speed) in October 2019, and the 13th event of the IFSC World Cup series from 9 to 11 September 2022.

The centre also hosted the IFSC World Youth Championship in 2004 and 2010, The European Youth Championships in 2015, and the European Youth Cup 2009, 2011, 2012, 2013 and 2014.

At a national level the British Lead Climbing Championships and the Youth Climbing Series Grand Final have been held alternately at the centre since 2008.

Theatre
In the Edinburgh International Festival 2013, Leaving Planet Earth used the centre as the stage.

Politics
On 20 April 2015 the Scottish National Party held their manifesto launch for the 2015 general election in the main climbing arena.

References

External links

 

2003 establishments in Scotland
Climbing areas of Scotland
Sports venues in Edinburgh
Indoor climbing